Fodora may refer to several villages in Romania:

 Fodora, a village in Aşchileu Commune, Cluj County
 Fodora, a village in Gâlgău Commune, Sălaj County